The 2017–18 UEFA Women's Champions League qualifying round was played between 22 and 28 August 2017. A total of 40 teams competed in the qualifying round to decide 11 of the 32 places in the knockout phase of the 2017–18 UEFA Women's Champions League.

Draw

The draw of the qualifying round was held on 23 June 2017, 13:30 CEST, at the UEFA headquarters in Nyon, Switzerland. The 40 teams were allocated into four seeding positions based on their UEFA club coefficients at the beginning of the season. They were drawn into ten groups of four containing one team from each of the four seeding positions. First, the ten teams which were pre-selected as hosts were drawn from their own designated pot and allocated to their respective group as per their seeding positions. Next, the remaining 30 teams were drawn from their respective pot which were allocated according to their seeding positions.

Based on the decision taken by the UEFA Emergency Panel at its meeting in Paris on 9 June 2016, teams from Serbia or Bosnia and Herzegovina would not be drawn against teams from Kosovo.

Below were the 40 teams which participated in the qualifying round (with their 2017 UEFA club coefficients, which took into account their performance in European competitions from 2012–13 to 2016–17 plus 33% of their association coefficient from the same time span), with the ten teams which were pre-selected as hosts marked by (H).

Format

In each group, teams played against each other in a round-robin mini-tournament at the pre-selected hosts. The ten group winners and the runners-up with the best record against the teams finishing first and third in their group advanced to the round of 32 to join the 21 teams which received a bye.

Tiebreakers

Teams were ranked according to points (3 points for a win, 1 point for a draw, 0 points for a loss), and if tied on points, the following tiebreaking criteria were applied, in the order given, to determine the rankings (Regulations Articles 14.01 and 14.02):
Points in head-to-head matches among tied teams;
Goal difference in head-to-head matches among tied teams;
Goals scored in head-to-head matches among tied teams;
If more than two teams are tied, and after applying all head-to-head criteria above, a subset of teams are still tied, all head-to-head criteria above are reapplied exclusively to this subset of teams;
Goal difference in all group matches;
Goals scored in all group matches;
Penalty shoot-out if only two teams have the same number of points, and they met in the last round of the group and are tied after applying all criteria above (not used if more than two teams have the same number of points, or if their rankings are not relevant for qualification for the next stage);
Disciplinary points (red card = 3 points, yellow card = 1 point, expulsion for two yellow cards in one match = 3 points);
UEFA club coefficient.

To determine the best runner-up, the results against the teams in fourth place were discarded. The following criteria were applied (Regulations Article 14.03):
Points;
Goal difference;
Goals scored;
Disciplinary points;
UEFA club coefficient.

Groups

The matches were played on 22, 25 and 28 August 2017. In each group, the schedule was as follows (Regulations Article 19.05):

All times were CEST (UTC+2).

Group 1

Group 2

Group 3

Group 4

Group 5

Group 6

Group 7

Group 8

Group 9

Group 10

Ranking of second-placed teams
To determine the best second-placed team from the qualifying round which advanced to the knockout phase, only the results of the second-placed teams against the first and third-placed teams in their group were taken into account, while results against the fourth-placed team were not included. As a result, two matches played by each second-placed team counted for the purposes of determining the ranking.

References
– Match attendances source: Soccerway.

External links
Official website
UEFA Women's Champions League history: 2017/18

1
August 2017 sports events in Europe